Sari Havas (born 25 January 1962 in Kolari, Finland) is a Finnish actress.

Havas began her career in acting in 1986 in the film Born American but has mostly appeared on television in Finland and has also written a number of TV series since 1990. She recently appeared in the 2006 film Saippuaprinssi  in which she worked with actors such as Mikko Leppilampi, Pamela Tola and Teijo Eloranta.

Filmography
Young Love, 2001

References

External links
 

1962 births
Living people
People from Kolari
Finnish film actresses
Finnish television actresses
Finnish television writers
Women television writers
Finnish women writers
20th-century Finnish actresses
21st-century Finnish actresses